This article refers to one of the former prefectures of Chad. From 2002 the country was divided into 18 regions.

Chari-Baguirmi was one of the 14 prefectures of Chad. Located in the west of the country, Chari-Baguirmi covered an area of 82,910 square kilometers and had a population of 720,941 in 1993. Its capital was Ndjamena.

References

Prefectures of Chad

de:Chari-Baguirmi
fr:Chari-Baguirmi